Hindu Kush is a mountain range in Afghanistan and Pakistan.

Hindukush or Hindu Kush may also refer to:

 Hindukush (Jowzjan) a location in Jowzjan Province, northern Afghanistan
 Hindukush, Iran, a village in Karchambu-e Shomali Rural District, Iran

See also
 Hindukush Kafir people, an ethnic group native to the Nuristan region of eastern Afghanistan
 Kush (disambiguation)
 Kushi (disambiguation)